Liv Johanne Ullmann (born 16 December 1938) is a Norwegian actress and film director. Recognised as one of the greatest European actresses of all time, Ullmann is known as the muse and frequent partner of filmmaker Ingmar Bergman. She acted in many of his films, including Persona (1966), Cries and Whispers (1972), Scenes from a Marriage (1973), The Passion of Anna (1969), and Autumn Sonata (1978).

Ullmann won a Golden Globe Award for Best Actress – Motion Picture Drama in 1972 for the film The Emigrants (1971) and has been nominated for another four. In 2000, she was nominated for the Palme d'Or for her second directorial feature film, Faithless. She has received two BAFTA Award nominations, and two nominations for the Academy Award for Best Actress, for The Emigrants (1971) and Ingmar Bergman's Face to Face (1976). On March 25, 2022, Ullmann was presented with an Honorary Academy Award in recognition of her "bravery and emotional transparency that has gifted audiences with deeply affecting screen portrayals".

Early life 
Ullmann was born in Tokyo, Japan, the daughter of Norwegian parents, Erik Viggo Ullmann (1907–1945), an aircraft engineer who was working in Tokyo at the time, and Janna Erbe (née Lund; 1910–1996).

Her grandfather was sent to the Dachau concentration camp during the World War II for helping Jews escape from the town where he lived in Norway; he died in this camp. When she was two years old, the family moved to Toronto, Ontario, Canada, where her father worked at the Norwegian air force base on Toronto Island (in Lake Ontario) during the Second World War. The family moved to New York, where four years later, her father died after a lengthy hospitalization from head injuries due to being struck by an airplane propeller, his death affecting her greatly. Her mother worked as a bookseller, while raising two daughters. They eventually moved to Norway, settling in Trondheim.

Career 

Ullmann began her acting career as a stage actress in Norway during the mid-1950s. She continued to act in theatre for most of her career and became noted for her portrayal of Nora in Henrik Ibsen's play A Doll's House.

She became better known once she started to work with Swedish movie director Ingmar Bergman. She later acted, with acclaim, in 10 of his movies, including Persona (1966), The Passion of Anna (1969), Cries and Whispers (1972), and Autumn Sonata (1978), in the last of which her co-actress Ingrid Bergman resumed her own Swedish cinema career. She co-acted often with Swedish actor and fellow Bergman collaborator Erland Josephson, with whom she made the Swedish television drama Scenes from a Marriage (1973), which was also edited to feature-movie length and distributed theatrically. Ullmann acted with Laurence Olivier in A Bridge Too Far (1977), directed by Richard Attenborough.

Nominated more than 40 times for awards, including various lifetime achievement awards, she won the best actress prize three times from the National Society of Film Critics, three times from the National Board of Review, received three awards from the New York Film Critics Circle, and a Golden Globe. During 1971, Ullmann was nominated for an Academy Award for Best Actress for the movie The Emigrants, and again during 1976 for the movie Face to Face.

Ullmann made her New York City stage debut in 1975 also in A Doll's House. Appearances in Anna Christie and Ghosts followed, as well as the less than successful musical version of I Remember Mama. This show, composed by Richard Rodgers, experienced numerous revisions during a long preview period, then closed after 108 performances. She also featured in the widely deprecated musical movie remake of Lost Horizon during 1973. In 1977, when she appeared on Broadway at the Imperial Theatre in Eugene O'Neill's Anna Christie, The New York Times said that she "glowed with despair and hope, and was everything one could have wished her to have been" in a performance "not to be missed and never to be forgotten", with her "grace and authority" that was "perhaps more than Garbo...born for Anna Christie:--Or more properly, Anna Christie was born for her."

In 1980, Brian De Palma, who directed Carrie, wanted Liv Ullmann to play the role of Kate Miller in the erotic crime thriller Dressed to Kill and offered it to her, but she declined because of the violence. The role subsequently went to Angie Dickinson. In 1982, Ingmar Bergman wanted Ullmann to play Emelie Ekdahl in his last feature film, Fanny and Alexander, and wrote the role with this in mind. She declined it, feeling the role was too sad. She later stated in interviews that turning it down was one of the few things she really regretted.

During 1984, she was chairperson of the jury at the 34th Berlin International Film Festival, and during 2001 chaired the jury of the Cannes Film Festival. She introduced her daughter, Linn Ullmann, to the audience with the words: "Here comes the woman whom Ingmar Bergman loves the most". Her daughter was there to receive the Prize of Honour on behalf of her father; she would return to serve the jury herself during 2011. She published two autobiographies, Changing (1977) and Choices (1984).

Ullmann's first film as a director was Sofie (1992); her friend and former co-actor, Erland Josephson, starred on it. She later directed the Bergman-composed movie Faithless (2000). Faithless garnered nominations for both the Palme d'Or and Best Actress category at the Cannes Film Festival.

In 2003, Ullmann reprised her role for Scenes from a Marriage in Saraband (2003), Bergman's final telemovie. Her previous screen role had been in the Swedish movie Zorn (1994).

In 2004, Ullmann revealed that she had received an offer in November 2003 to play in three episodes of the American television series, Sex and the City. She was amused by the offer, and said that it was one of the few programs she regularly watched, but she turned it down. Later that year, Steven Soderbergh wrote a role in the movie Ocean's 12 especially for her, but she also turned that down.

During 2006, Ullmann announced that she had been forced to end her longtime wish of making a film based on A Doll's House. According to her statement, the Norwegian Film Fund was preventing her and writer Ketil Bjørnstad from pursuing the project. Australian actress Cate Blanchett and British actress Kate Winslet had been cast intended in the main roles of the movie. She later directed Blanchett in the play A Streetcar Named Desire, by Tennessee Williams, at the Sydney Theatre Company in Sydney, which was performed September through October 2009, and then continued from 29 October to 21 November 2009 at the John F. Kennedy Center for the Performing Arts in Washington, D.C., where it won a Helen Hayes Award for Outstanding Non-resident Production as well as actress and supporting performer for 2009. The play was also performed at the Brooklyn Academy of Music in Brooklyn, New York. Ullmann narrated the Canada–Norway co-produced animated short movie The Danish Poet (2006), which won the Academy Award for Animated Short Film at the 79th Academy Awards during 2007. 

In 2008, she was the head of the jury at the 30th Moscow International Film Festival.

During 2012, she attended the International Indian Film Academy Awards in Singapore, where she was honored for her Outstanding Contributions to International Cinema and she also showed her movie on her relationship with Ingmar Bergman. In 2013, Ullmann directed a film adaptation of Miss Julie. The film, released in September 2014, stars Jessica Chastain, Colin Farrell, and Samantha Morton. It was widely praised by the Norwegian press.

In March 2022 it was announced by the Academy of Motion Picture Arts and Sciences that Ullmann would receive the Academy Honorary Award. John Lithgow presented her with the statue at the Governors Awards saying, "For those few who claim that she never would've been called one of our greatest actors without Ingmar Bergman, I would answer, Bergman would probably never been called one of our greatest filmmakers without Liv Ullman".

Personal life

Marriages, relationships and children 
Ullman has been married and divorced twice. Her daughter is from a relationship with Swedish director Ingmar Bergman.

Ullman was married in 1960 to Norwegian psychiatrist, Hans Jakob Stang, until 1965. The 25-year old Ullman's life changed focus when she met 46-year old Ingmar Bergman. Their relationship quickly moved into an affair which lasted from 1965 to 1970. Writer Linn Ullmann (b. 1966) is their daughter.

Following an affair with the actor John Lithgow, Ullman married Boston real estate developer Donald Saunders in 1985, and they remained together after their 1995 divorce.

Honors and causes 
She is a UNICEF Goodwill Ambassador, and has traveled widely for the organization. She is also co-founder and honorary chair of the Women's Refugee Commission.

In 2005, King Harald V of Norway made Ullmann a Commander with Star of the Order of St. Olav.

She received an honorary degree, a Doctorate of Philosophy, from the Norwegian University of Science and Technology (NTNU) in 2006.

Other 
In addition to Norwegian, Ullmann speaks Swedish, English, and other European languages.

Filmography

Film 
As actress

As director

Television

Theatre

Awards and recognition 

Honors
 1972: Golden Globe for Best Actress in a Motion Picture – Drama, (The Emigrants)
 1984: Four Freedoms Laureate, Freedom from Want
 2006: Ibsen Centennial Commemoration Award
 2006: The Danish Poet won its director Torill Kove the Academy Award for Best Animated Short Film at the 79th Academy Awards.
 2010: 2010 FIAF Award 
 2012: International Indian Film Academy Awards for Outstanding Contribution to International Cinema
 2021: Academy Honorary Award

See also
 List of film and television directors
 List of theatre directors in the 20th-21st centuries
 List of Norwegian actors
 List of Norwegian writers

References

Further reading 
 Robert Emmet Long, ed. (2006). Liv Ullmann: Interviews. University Press of Mississippi. , 1-57806-824-X (paper). Collected interviews with Ullmann.
 David Outerbridge (1979). Without Makeup, Liv Ullmann: A Photo-Biography. New York City: William Morrow and Company. .
 Liv Ullmann (1977). Changing. New York City: Knopf. . Autobiography.
 Liv Ullmann (1984). Choices. New York: Knopf. . . Autobiography.

External links 

 The Guardian/NFT interview with Shane Danielson, 23 January 2001 
 Peter Bradshaw review of Trolösa , The Guardian, 9 February 2001
 

1938 births
20th-century Norwegian actresses
21st-century Norwegian actresses
Actresses from Tokyo
Best Drama Actress Golden Globe (film) winners
David di Donatello winners
European Film Awards winners (people)
Norwegian women film directors
Women television directors
Living people
Norwegian autobiographers
Norwegian Christians
Norwegian expatriates in the United States
Norwegian film actresses
Norwegian film directors
Norwegian screenwriters
Norwegian stage actresses
Norwegian television actresses
Norwegian television directors
Norwegian theatre directors
Norwegian voice actresses
People from Trondheim
UNICEF Goodwill Ambassadors
American women screenwriters
Best Actress Guldbagge Award winners
Women autobiographers
English-language film directors
Recipients of the Four Freedoms Award
Norwegian women screenwriters
Norwegian Lutherans